The Double Header was a gay bar located at 407 2nd Avenue S in Seattle's Pioneer Square neighborhood, in the U.S. state of Washington. The LGBT establishment opened in 1934 and closed in December 2015. It was thought to be the oldest gay bar in the United States.

In the basement of the building, a gay dance club called The Casino operated from the 1930s to the 1950s; afterwards it was converted into a diner. It was popular with drag queens.

References

1934 establishments in Washington (state)
2015 disestablishments in Washington (state)
Defunct LGBT drinking establishments in the United States
LGBT culture in Seattle
LGBT drinking establishments in Washington (state)
Pioneer Square, Seattle